The Accademia degli Intronati was a prominent literary and scholarly society in Siena. It was founded between 1525 and 1527 as a gathering place for aristocracy, and was prominent by the 1550s. 

The first publicly hosted event was the comic play Gl'ingannati, written collectively by the Intronatis. A characteristic of the Academy was its preference for comedy and the targeting of a female public. This distinguished the plays of the Academy's first wave of productions.

See also
Commedia dell'Arte
Shakespeare's Twelfth Night
Biblioteca Comunale degli Intronati

References

Further reading
Cerreta, Florindo (1960) Alessandro Piccolomini
Costantini, L.P. (1928) L'Accademia degli Intronati di Siena e una sua commedia

History of Siena
Theatre companies in Italy
16th-century establishments in the Republic of Siena
1525 establishments in Italy
Italian writers' organisations